Phacopida ("lens-face") is an order of trilobites that lived from the Late Cambrian to the Late Devonian. It is made up of a morphologically diverse assemblage of taxa in three related suborders.

Characteristics 

Phacopida had 8 to 19 thoracic segments and are distinguishable by the expanded glabella, short or absent preglabellar area, and schizochroal (Phacopina) or holochroal (Cheirurina and Calymenina) eyes. Schizochroal eyes are compound eyes with up to around 700 separate lenses. Each lens has an individual cornea which extended into a rather large sclera.

The development of schizochroal eyes in phacopid trilobites is an example of post-displacement paedomorphosis. The eyes of immature holochroal Cambrian trilobites were basically miniature schizochroal eyes. In Phacopida, these were retained, via delayed growth of these immature structures (post-displacement), into the adult form.

Eldredgeops rana (Phacopidae) and Dalmanites limulurus (Dalmanitidae) are two of the best-known members of this order. Other known phacopids include Cheirurus (Cheiruridae), Deiphon (Cheiruridae), Calymene (Calymenidae), Flexicalymene (Calymenidae) and Ceraurinella (Cheiruridae).

Evolution 
The origin of the order Phacopida is uncertain. It comprises three suborders (Phacopina, Calymenina, and Cheirurina) which share a distinctive protaspis (unsegmented larva ) with three pairs of spines on its body. The Cheirurina and Calymenina retain a rostral plate (an apomorphy) but in virtually all Phacopina the free cheeks are yoked as a single piece. This sort of similarity in development suggests phylogenetic unity. The suborder Calymenina is the most primitive of the Phacopida order and shares some characteristics with the order Ptychopariida, though it is not included in the subclass Librostoma.

Phacopida was one of only two trilobite orders (along with the Proetida) to survive the Kellwasser event (Late Devonian extinction) at the Frasnian-Famennian boundary. However, they would die out soon afterwards at the Hangenberg event (end-Devonian extinction) at the end of the Famennian.

Classification 

 Suborder Calymenina
 Family Bathycheilidae
 Family Bavarillidae
 Family Calymenidae
 Family Homalonotidae
 Family Pharostomatidae
 Suborder Cheirurina
 Family Cheiruridae
 Family Encrinuridae
 Family Pilekiidae
 Family Pliomeridae
 Suborder Phacopina
 Superfamily Acastoidea
 Family Acastidae
 Family Calmoniidae
 Superfamily Dalmanitoidea
 Family Dalmanitidae
 Family Diaphanometopidae
 Family Prosopiscidae
 Superfamily Phacopoidea
 Family Phacopidae
 Family Pterygometopidae

References

External links
Order Phacopida

 
Trilobite orders
Early Ordovician first appearances
Famennian extinctions
Taxa named by John William Salter